The Clarke Community School District is a rural public school district headquartered in Osceola, Iowa.

The district is mostly in Clarke County, with a small area in Decatur County.  It serves the city of Osceola, the towns of Van Wert, Weldon, Woodburn, and the surrounding rural areas.

The school's athletic teams are the Indians, and their colors are maroon and white.

Schools
The district operates three schools, all in Osceola:
 Clarke Community Elementary School
 Clarke Community Middle School
 Clarke Community High School

Clarke Community High School

Athletics
The Indians participate in the South Central Conference in the following sports.
Football
Cross Country
Volleyball
Basketball
Bowling
Wrestling
Golf
Tennis
Track and Field
Baseball
Softball
 2-time State Champions (1995, 2014)

See also
List of school districts in Iowa
List of high schools in Iowa

References

External links
 

School districts in Iowa
Education in Clarke County, Iowa
Education in Decatur County, Iowa